Hancock's President's Reserve Bourbon Whiskey is a single barrel bourbon whiskey produced in Frankfort, Kentucky by the Sazerac Company at Buffalo Trace Distillery. The brand is sold as a  straight bourbon. It is sold in glass in 750ml bottles.

Hancock's President's Reserve is named after the early American settler Hancock Lee.

References

External links
 Official site for blend variation 
 Official site for straight variation 

Bourbon whiskey
Sazerac Company brands